The Yumeya Dream Cup was a professional golf tournament on the Ladies Asian Golf Tour held in Japan between 2011 and 2013. 

The tournament was founded as the Yumeya Championship and played at the Hirao Country Club in Aichi Prefecture, near Nagoya. It offered prize money of $130,000, raised to $200,000 in 2013.

Winners

Source:

References

External links
Ladies Asian Golf Tour

Ladies Asian Golf Tour events
Golf tournaments in Japan